August 2019 Kabul bombing may refer to: 

7 August 2019 Kabul bombing
17 August 2019 Kabul bombing